Askett is a picturesque hamlet in the civil parish of Princes Risborough, Buckinghamshire, England. It is situated where the steep escarpment of the Chiltern Hills meets the flat expanse of the Vale of Aylesbury. It lies within an Area of Outstanding Natural Beauty and Conservation Area less than four miles from Chequers, country home of the UK Prime Minister.

One mile from the market town of Princes Risborough, Askett is served with The Three Crowns pub and an Indian restaurant, The Coco Tamarind. The nearby Monks Risborough railway station provides direct access to London Marylebone.

History
The Manor house at Askett sat on the site of Old Manor Close estate. At the beginning of the 20th century small cottages resided on the original land but by 1969 had been demolished and in 1983 five new houses were built. Opposite the entrance to the estate stood the wheelwrights shop where a modern bungalow now stands.

In the 19th Century, the small hamlet was a renowned village for lacemaking. By the 20th Century, villages like Askett and Kimble became the stopping point on the way to Aylesbury, Dillons Garage was a small well-known service station opened in Askett in 1933 which has since been demolished.

The village still holds many old fashioned cottages and bungalows. The area has more recently been described as 'A Hamlet in a Meadow'.

References

Hamlets in Buckinghamshire